The following outline is provided as an overview of and topical guide to video games:

Video game – an electronic game that involves interaction with a user interface to generate visual feedback on a video device. The word video in video game traditionally referred to a raster display device, but following popularization of the term "video game", it now implies any type of display device.

Video game genres 

Video game genres (list) – categories of video games based on their gameplay interaction and set of gameplay challenges, rather than visual or narrative differences.

Action game 
Action game –  a video game genre that emphasizes physical challenges, including hand–eye coordination and reaction-time.
 Beat 'em up –  a video game genre featuring melee combat between the protagonist and a large number of underpowered antagonists.
 Fighting game –  a genre where the player controls an on-screen character and engages in close combat with an opponent.
 Platform game –  requires the player to control a character to jump to and from suspended platforms or over obstacles (jumping puzzles).
First-person shooter –  a video game genre that centers the gameplay on gun and projectile weapon-based combat through first-person perspective; i.e., the player experiences the action through the eyes of a protagonist.
 Light gun shooter –  a genre in which the primary design element is aiming and shooting with a gun-shaped controller.
 Shoot 'em up –  a genre where the player controls a lone character, often in a spacecraft or aircraft, shooting large numbers of enemies while dodging their attacks.
 Third-person shooter –  a genre of 3D action games in which the player character is visible on-screen, and the gameplay consists primarily of shooting.
Hero shooter –  multiplayer first- or third-person shooters that strongly encourage cooperative play between players on a single team through the use of pre-designed "hero" characters that each possess unique attributes, skills, weapons, and other activated abilities.
Tactical shooter –  includes both first-person shooters and third-person shooters and simulates realistic combat, thus making tactics and caution more important than quick reflexes in other action games.
Survival game – a genre that is set in a hostile, intense, open-world environment, where players generally begin with minimal equipment and are required to collect resources, craft tools, weapons, and shelter, and survive as long as possible.
Battle royale game –  a subgenre that blends the survival, exploration, and scavenging elements of a survival game with last-man-standing gameplay.

Action-adventure game 

Action-adventure game –  a video game genre that combines elements of both the adventure game and the action game genres.
Open world –  a type of video game level design where a player can roam freely through a virtual world and is given considerable freedom in choosing how to approach objectives.
 Grand Theft Auto clone –  a type of open world design where the player is given a simulated environment and, optionally, exterminate the local inhabitants.  See also Grand Theft Auto.
 Metroidvania –  a type of level design where a player is in a more restrictive environment and tasked with an end goal objective, usually with an emphasis on gathering powering ups from exploring the environment.
 Stealth game –  a type of game where the objective is to remain undetected from hostile opponents.
 Survival horror –  a type of game where fear is a primary factor in play, usually by restricting useful or power-up items in a dark, claustrophobic environment.

Adventure game 
Adventure game –  a video game in which the player assumes the role of protagonist in an interactive story driven by exploration and puzzle-solving instead of physical challenge.
 Graphic adventure game –  any adventure game that relies on graphical imagery, rather than being primarily text-based.
 Escape the room –  a subgenre of adventure game which requires a player to escape from imprisonment by exploiting their surroundings.
 Interactive fiction –  games in which players input text commands to control characters and influence the environment. In some interactive fiction, text descriptions are the primary or only way the simulated environment is communicated to the player.
 Interactive movie –  a type of video game that features highly cinematic presentation and heavy use of scripting, often through the use of full motion video of either animated or live-action footage.
 Visual novel –  a type of adventure game featuring text accompanied by mostly static graphics, usually with anime-style art, or occasionally live-action stills or video footage

Role-playing video game 

Role-playing video game (RPG): a video game genre with origins in pen-and-paper role-playing games such as Dungeons & Dragons, using much of the same terminology, settings and game mechanics. The player in RPGs controls one character, or several adventuring party members, fulfilling one or many quests.
Action role-playing game –  a loosely defined subgenre of role-playing video games that incorporate elements of action or action-adventure games, emphasizing real-time action where the player has direct control over characters, instead of turn-based or menu-based combat.
 Hack and slash –  a type of gameplay that emphasizes combat.
 Role-playing shooter –  a subgenre, featuring elements of both shooter games and action RPGs.
 Dungeon crawl –  a type of scenario in fantasy role-playing games in which heroes navigate a labyrinthine environment, battling various monsters, and looting any treasure they may find.
 Roguelike –  a subgenre of role-playing video games, characterized by randomization for replayability, permanent death, and turn-based movement.
 MUD –  a multiplayer real-time virtual world, with the term usually referring to text-based instances of these.
 Massively multiplayer online role-playing game –  a genre of role-playing video games in which a very large number of players interact with one another within a persistent virtual world.
 Tactical role-playing game –  a subgenre of role-playing video games that incorporate elements of strategy video games

Simulation video game 

Simulation video game –  a diverse super-category of video games, generally designed to closely simulate aspects of a real or fictional reality.
Construction and management simulation –  a type of simulation game in which players build, expand or manage fictional communities or projects with limited resources.
 Business simulation game –  games that focus on the management of economic processes, usually in the form of a business.
 City-building game –  games in which players act as the overall planner and leader of a city, looking down on it from above, and being responsible for its growth and management.
 Government simulation game –  a game genre that attempts to simulate the government and politics of all or part of a nation.
 Life simulation game –  simulation video games in which the player lives or controls one or more virtual lifeforms.
 Digital pet –  a type of artificial human companion, usually kept for companionship or enjoyment. Digital pets are distinct in that they have no concrete physical form other than the computer they run on.
 God game –  a type of life simulation game that casts the player in the position of controlling the game on a large scale, as an entity with divine/supernatural powers, as a great leader, or with no specified character, and places them in charge of a game setting containing autonomous characters to guard and influence.
 Social simulation game –  a subgenre of life simulation games that explores social interactions between multiple artificial lives.
 Dating sim –  a subgenre of social simulation games that focuses on romantic relationships.
 Sports game –  games that simulate the practice of traditional sports.

Strategy video game 

Strategy video game –  a genre that emphasizes skillful thinking and planning to achieve victory. They emphasize strategic, tactical, and sometimes logistical challenges. Many games also offer economic challenges and exploration.
4X game –  a genre in which players control an empire and "explore, expand, exploit, and exterminate".
 Artillery game –  the generic name for either early two- or three-player (usually turn-based) computer games involving tanks fighting each other in combat or similar derivative games.
 Real-time strategy (RTS) – a subgenre of strategy video game which does not progress incrementally in turns.
Tower defense –  a genre where the goal of the game is to try to stop enemies from crossing a map by building towers which shoot at them as they pass.
 Real-time tactics –  a subgenre of tactical wargames played in real-time simulating the considerations and circumstances of operational warfare and military tactics, differentiated from real-time strategy gameplay by the lack of resource micromanagement and base or unit building, as well as the greater importance of individual units and a focus on complex battlefield tactics.
 Multiplayer online battle arena (MOBA) – a hybrid of real-time strategy, role-playing and action video games where the objective is for the player's team to destroy the opposing side's main structure with the help of periodically spawned computer-controlled units that march towards the enemy's main structure.
 Tactical role-playing game –  a type of video game which incorporates elements of traditional role-playing video games and strategy games.
 Turn-based strategy –  a strategy game (usually some type of wargame, especially a strategic-level wargame) where players take turns when playing.
 Turn-based tactics –  a genre of strategy video games that through stop-action simulates the considerations and circumstances of operational warfare and military tactics in generally small-scale confrontations as opposed to more strategic considerations of turn-based strategy (TBS) games.
 Wargame –  a subgenre that emphasize strategic or tactical warfare on a map, as well as historical (or near-historical) accuracy.

Vehicle simulation game 

Vehicle simulation game –  games in which the objective is to operate a manual or motor powered transport.
Flight simulator –  a game where flying vehicles is the primary mode of operation.
 Amateur flight simulation –  an aircraft trainer with realistic controls.
 Combat flight simulator –  a type of game where players simulate the handling of military aircraft and their operations.
 Racing game –  a type of game where the player is in a racing competition.
Driving simulator –  a type of game where the player is tasked with using a vehicle as if it were real.
Sim racing –  a type of game where the player is tasked with using a realistic vehicle inside a racing competition.
 Space flight simulator game –  a type of game meant to emulate the experience of space flight.
 Submarine simulator –  a type of game where the player commands a submarine.
 Train simulator –  a simulation of rail transport operations.
 Vehicular combat game –  a type of game where vehicles with weapons are placed inside of an arena to battle.

Other genres 

Adult game –  a game which has significant sexual content (like an adult movie), and are therefore intended for an adult audience.
 Eroge –  a Japanese video game that features erotic content, usually in the form of anime-style artwork.
 Advergame –  the practice of using video games to advertise a product, organization or viewpoint.
 Art game –  a video game that is designed in such a way as to emphasize art or whose structure is intended to produce some kind of reaction in its audience.
 Audio game –  an interactive electronic game wherein the only feedback device is audible rather than visual.
 Christian video game –  any video game centered around Christianity or Christian themes.
 Educational game –  video games that have been specifically designed to teach people about a certain subject, expand concepts, reinforce development, understand an historical event or culture, or assist them in learning a skill as they play.
 Exergaming –  video games that are also a form of exercise and rely on technology that tracks body movement or reaction.
 Maze video games –  video game genre description first used by journalists during the 1980s to describe any game in which the entire playing field was a maze.
 Music video game –  a video game where the gameplay is meaningfully and often almost entirely oriented around the player's interactions with a musical score or individual songs.
Rhythm game –  games that challenge the player's sense of rhythm and focus on dance or the simulated performance of musical instruments, and require players to press buttons in a sequence dictated on the screen.
 Party video games: games commonly designed as a collection of simple minigames, designed to be intuitive and easy to control and to be played in multiplayer.
 Puzzle video game –  video games that emphasize puzzle solving, including logic, strategy, pattern recognition, sequence solving, and word completion.
 Serious game –  a video game designed for a primary purpose other than pure entertainment, generally referring to products used by industries like defense, education, scientific exploration, health care, emergency management, city planning, engineering, religion, and politics.

Other types of video games 

 Casual game –  a game of any genre that is targeted for a mass audience of casual gamers. Casual games typically have simple rules and require no long-term time commitment or special skills to play.
 Indie game –  games created by individuals or small teams without video game publisher financial support as well as often focus on innovation and rely on digital distribution.
 Minigame –  a short or more simplistic video game often contained within another video game.
 Non-game –  software that lies on the border between video games, toys and applications, with the main difference between non-games and traditional video games being the apparent lack of goals, objectives and challenges.
 Programming game –  a game where the player has no direct influence on the course of the game, instead a computer program or script is written that controls the actions of the characters.

Video game hardware platforms 
 Arcade game –  a coin-operated entertainment machine, usually installed in public businesses such as restaurants, bars, and amusement arcades. Arcade games include video games, pinball machines, electro-mechanical games, redemption games, and merchandisers (such as claw cranes).
 Video game arcade cabinet –  the housing within which a video arcade game's hardware resides.
 List of arcade games
 List of pinball machines
 Video game console –  a consumer entertainment device consisting of a customized computer system designed to run video games.
 Console game –  a video game played on a video game console.
 List of video game consoles
 List of best-selling game consoles
 Dedicated console –  a video game console that is dedicated to a built in game or games, and is not equipped for additional games, via cartridges or other media.
 Console wars –  a term used to refer to periods of intense competition for market share between video game console manufacturers.
 Handheld game console –  a lightweight, portable consumer electronic device with a built-in screen, game controls and speakers.
 Handheld video game –  a video game played on a handheld game console.
 Mobile game –  a video game played on a mobile phone, smartphone, PDA, tablet computer or portable media player.
 Online game –  a game played over some form of computer network.
 Browser game –  a video game that is played over the Internet using a web browser.
 Massively multiplayer online game (MMO): a multiplayer video game which is capable of supporting hundreds or thousands of players simultaneously.
 PC game –  a video game played on a personal computer, rather than on a video game console or arcade machine.

Gameplay 

Gameplay
 Gamer
 Single-player
 Multiplayer game
 Cooperative gameplay
 Cheating in online games
 Cheating
 Difficulty level
 Gaming computer
 Speedrun
 Ludonarrative
 Strategy guide

Specific video games 

Lists of video games
 List of best-selling video games
 List of best-selling video game franchises
 List of video games considered the best
 List of video games notable for negative reception
 Controversial video game
 List of cult video games
 List of arcade games
 List of video games based on comics
 List of video games based on DC Comics
 List of video games based on Marvel Comics
 List of video games based on anime or manga
 List of video games based on cartoons
 List of Disney video games
 List of Hanna-Barbera video games
 List of Looney Tunes video games

Video game industry 

Video game industry
List of video game companies
 List of commercial failures in video games
 List of video game developers
 List of video game publishers
 List of indie game developers
 List of video game industry people
 List of video game franchises
 Game studies
 Video game packaging
 Nintendo Seal of Quality
 Video game award
 Video game journalism

Video games by country

Africa
Video games in Kenya
Video games in Nigeria
Video games in South Africa

Asia
Video games in Bangladesh
Video games in China
Video games in India
Video games in Japan
Video games in Malaysia
Video games in Russia
Video games in South Korea
Video games in Thailand

Europe
Video games in Belgium
Video games in France
Video games in Germany
Video games in Lithuania
Video games in the Czech Republic
Video games in the Netherlands
Video games in the Republic of Ireland
Video games in the United Kingdom
Video games in Ukraine

North America
Video games in Canada
Video games in the United States

Oceania
Video games in Australia
Video games in New Zealand

South America
Video games in Brazil
Video games in Colombia

Video game development 
Video game development –  the software development process by which a video game is developed and video game developer is a software developer (a business or an individual) that creates video games.

Video game developer –  a software developer (a business or an individual) that creates video games.

Independent video game development –  the process of creating indie video games without the financial support of a video game publisher, usually designed by an individual or a small team.

 Game art design –  a process of creating 2D and 3D game art for a video game, such as concept art, item sprites, character models, etc.
 Video game artists: an artist who creates art for one or more types of games and are responsible for all of the aspects of game development that call for visual art.
 Video game graphics –  variety of individual computer graphic techniques that have evolved over time, primarily due to hardware advances and restrictions.
 Video game art –  the use of patched or modified video games or the repurposing of existing games or game structures.
 Concept art –  a form of illustration where the main goal is to convey a visual representation of a design, idea, and/or mood before it is put into the final product.
 Procedural texture –  a form of illustration where the main goal is to convey a visual representation of a design, idea, and/or mood for use in films, video games, animation, or comic books before it is put into the final product.
 2D computer graphics –  computer-based generation of digital images—mostly from two-dimensional models (such as 2D geometric models, text, and digital images) and by techniques specific to them.
 3D computer graphics –  graphics that use a three-dimensional representation of geometric data (often Cartesian) that is stored in the computer for the purposes of performing calculations and rendering 2D images.
 Game modification –  are made by the general public or a developer, and can be entirely new games in themselves, but mods are not standalone software and require the user to have the original release in order to run.
 Game music –  musical pieces or soundtracks and background musics found in video games ranging from a primitive synthesizer tune to an orchestral pieces and complex soundtracks.
 Game producer –  the person in charge of overseeing development of a video game.
 Game programming –  the programming of computer, console or arcade games.
 Game programmer –  a software engineer, programmer, or computer scientist who primarily develops codebase for video games or related software, such as game development tools.
 Game engine –  a system designed for the creation and development of video games.
 Game Artificial intelligence –  techniques used in computer and video games to produce the illusion of intelligence in the behavior of non-player characters (NPCs).
 Game publisher –  a company that publishes video games that they have either developed internally or have had developed by a video game developer.
 Game studies –  the discipline of studying games, their design, players, and their role in society and culture more broadly.
 Game testing –  a software testing process for quality control of video games, primary function being the discovery and documentation of software defects (aka bugs).
 Game journalism –  a branch of journalism concerned with the reporting and discussion of video games.
 Level design –  a discipline of game development involving creation of video game levels—locales, stages, or missions.
 Level editor (tool) –  a software tool used to design levels, maps, campaigns, etc. and virtual worlds for a video game.
 Video game design –  the process of designing the content and rules of a game in the pre-production stage and design of gameplay, environment, storyline, and characters during production stage.
 Other concepts
 Interaction design
 Expansion pack
 Video game remake
 Fan translation
 Fangame
 Abandonware
 XGameStation

History of video games 

History of video games

By period 

 Early history of video games
 First video game
 Pong
 History of first generation video game consoles (1972–1977)
 History of second generation video game consoles (1976–1984)
 History of third generation video game consoles (1983–1992)
 History of fourth generation video game consoles (1987–1996)
 History of fifth generation video game consoles (1993–2006)
 History of sixth generation video game consoles (1998–2015)
 History of seventh generation video game consoles (2005–2020)
 History of eighth generation video game consoles (2011–)
 History of ninth generation video game consoles (2020–)

By decade 
 1980s in video games
 1990s in video games
 2000s in video games
 2010s in video games

By year 
Prior to 1972
1970
1971
1972
1973
1974
1975
1976
1977
1978
1979
1980
1981
1982
1983
1984
1985
1986
1987
1988
1989
1990
1991
1992
1993
1994
1995
1996
1997
1998
1999
2000
2001
2002
2003
2004
2005
2006
2007
2008
2009
2010
2011
2012
2013
2014
2015
2016
2017
2018
2019
2020
2021
2022
2023

By platform 
 History of arcade games
 Golden age of video arcade games
 Timeline of video arcade game history
 Chronology of console role-playing games
 History of video game consoles
 Video game crash of 1983
 History of personal computer games

By genre 
 History of action games
 History of action-adventure games
 History of adventure games
 History of role-playing video games
 History of sports games
 History of strategy video games

Culture of video games 

 Video game culture
 Video game art
 Video game collecting
 Game studies
 Gamers Outreach Foundation
 List of books about video games
 List of books based on video games
 List of films based on video games
 List of television programs based on video games
 List of anime based on video games
 List of video game webcomics
 List of video game websites
 Gender representation in video games
 Video game magazines

Psychology 

 Video game addiction
 Video game behavioral effects
 Gamers Outreach Foundation

People influential in video games 
 List of video game industry people
 List of women in the video game industry
 List of electronic sports players

See also 
 Game classification
 ROM
 Texture artist
 Unlockable game
 Video game accessibility
 Video game console emulator
 Video game etiquette
 Non-game
 Strategy guide
 Women and video games

 Lists
 List of home computers by video hardware

References

External links 

 The Virtual Museum of Computing (VMoC)
 Interactive video game history timeline
 Video Game Museum in Paris

outline
 
Video games
Video games
Video games